The Rural Municipality of Archie is a former rural municipality (RM) in the Canadian province of Manitoba. It was originally incorporated as a rural municipality on December 22, 1883. It ceased on January 1, 2015 as a result of its provincially mandated amalgamation with the RM of Ellice and the Village of St. Lazare to form the Rural Municipality of Ellice – Archie.

Archie was named in 1883 after Archie McDonald, a chief factor with the Hudson's Bay Company at Fort Ellice. Its economic base was primarily agriculture and the geography included the Assiniboine River and related valleys. It was about 345 square kilometres and the largest centre was McAuley.

It bordered a small part of the Birdtail Sioux First Nation in its northeast section.

Communities 
 Manson
 McAuley
 Willen

Reeves

External links 
 Official website
 Map of Archie R.M. at Statcan

References 

 Manitoba Municipalities: Rural Municipality of Archie

Former rural municipalities in Manitoba
Populated places disestablished in 2015
2015 disestablishments in Manitoba